Benson Building, also known as the IPC Building, is a historic retail and office located at Baltimore, Maryland, United States. It is on the corner of East Franklin and North Charles Streets. The main side is on Charles Street and has seven bays with store windows and entrances on the first floor, and office windows on the upper floors. The recessed storefronts feature bronzed aluminum infill panels above and below the glass panes.  It was constructed in 1911 and the principal original occupant was C.J. Benson and Company, a local interior decorating and furniture establishment.

The Benson Building was listed on the National Register of Historic Places in 1980.

References

External links
, including undated photo, at Maryland Historical Trust

Buildings and structures in Baltimore
Commercial buildings on the National Register of Historic Places in Baltimore
Commercial buildings completed in 1911
Downtown Baltimore
1911 establishments in Maryland